Eumaeus godartii, the white-tipped cycadian, is a butterfly of the family Lycaenidae. It is found from Nicaragua to western Ecuador.

References

Butterflies described in 1870
Eumaeini
Lycaenidae of South America
Taxa named by Jean Baptiste Boisduval